OKB Gifu Seiryu Arena is an arena in Gifu, Gifu, Japan. It is the home arena of the Gifu Swoops of the B.League, Japan's professional basketball league.

References

Basketball venues in Japan
Gifu Swoops
Indoor arenas in Japan
Sports venues in Gifu Prefecture
Buildings and structures in Gifu
Sports venues completed in 1965
1965 establishments in Japan